Maytee Zaray Martinez (born March 7, 1994) in New Jersey) is a Cuban American model, designer, and television personality. She was raised in West New York, New Jersey. Martinez began modeling at the age of 13, when she moved to Miami, Florida, to pursue modeling. Here, she enrolled in modeling classes at the Alicia Faccio Modeling School in Doral, Florida, and graduated from Miami International University for Art & Design with a Bachelor's Degree in Fashion Merchandise in 2010. That year, she was featured on Tyra Banks' site as a finalist for America's Next Top Model and was on the Nuvo TV reality show Model Latina. Maytee was also a contestant on the second season of the E! Network's House of DVF.

Career

Modeling
As a runway model, Martinez has worked for designers such as Dior, Guess, Valentino, Carolina Herrera, Roberto Cavalli, and others. She has also modeled at fashion weeks, including the Mercedes Benz Fashion Week, New York Fashion Week, and Miami International Fashion Week. 

Martinez appeared in the Colombian television series El Cartel de Los Sapos, the BET movie, and a number of short films. She also appeared on the popular Univision program, Sabado Gigante.

In March 2012, she was named the Queen (Reina) of New Jersey's annual Cuban American Parade.

Designer
In 2013, Martinez launched her new swimwear line, "Adoro by Maytee by M."

Philanthropy 
Martinez has worked with organizations including Art Hearts Fashion, Aids Healthcare Foundation, Fashion Designers Expo/Let the Runway Meet the Cause, Susan G. Komen.

Personal life 

Martinez is the sister of Big Brother 19 winner and The Challenge veteran Josh Martinez.

References

External links
 
 Maytee Martinez at the Fashion Model Directory
 Online Portfolio
 Adoro by Maytee M. Adoro Swim

1991 births
Living people
American female models
People from West New York, New Jersey